The Phoenix Thunderbirds Open was a golf tournament on the LPGA Tour from 1962 to 1965. It was played at two different courses in the Phoenix, Arizona area: Paradise Valley Country Club in 1962, Arizona Biltmore Country Club in 1963 to 1965.

Winners
Phoenix Thunderbirds Open
 1965 Marlene Hagge

Phoenix Thunderbirds Ladies' Open
 1964 Ruth Jessen

Phoenix Thunderbirds Ladies Open
 1963 Sandra Haynie

Phoenix Thunderbird Open
 1962 Kathy Whitworth

References

Former LPGA Tour events
Golf in Arizona
Sports in Phoenix, Arizona
Women's sports in Arizona